Achitpol Keereerom (born 21 October 2001) is a Thai professional footballer who plays as a striker for Regionalliga Bayern club FC Augsburg II.

International career
On 26 May 2022, Keereerom was called up to the Thailand under-23 for the 2022 AFC U-23 Asian Cup.

International goals

Thailand U19

References

External links
 

2001 births
Living people
Achitpol Keereerom
Achitpol Keereerom
Association football forwards
Thai expatriate sportspeople in Germany
Achitpol Keereerom
Regionalliga players
TSV 1860 Rosenheim players
FC Augsburg II players